Örenkaya (formerly: Macıl) is a village in the Sandıklı District, Afyonkarahisar Province, Turkey. Its population is 1,331 (2021). Before the 2013 reorganisation, it was a town (belde).

References

Villages in Sandıklı District